Noble Township is one of the twelve townships of Defiance County, Ohio, United States. The 2010 census found 6,326 people in the township, 3,907 of whom lived in the city of Defiance, and 2,419 of whom lived in the unincorporated portions of the township.

Geography
Located in the eastern part of the county, it borders the following townships:
Tiffin Township - north
Adams Township - northeast corner
Richland Township - east
Defiance Township - south
Delaware Township - west
Washington Township - northwest corner

A part of the county seat of Defiance is located in southeastern Noble Township.

Name and history
Statewide, other Noble Townships are located in Auglaize and Noble counties.

Government
The township is governed by a three-member board of trustees, who are elected in November of odd-numbered years to a four-year term beginning on the following January 1. Two are elected in the year after the presidential election and one is elected in the year before it. There is also an elected township fiscal officer, who serves a four-year term beginning on April 1 of the year after the election, which is held in November of the year before the presidential election. Vacancies in the fiscal officership or on the board of trustees are filled by the remaining trustees.

Transportation
U.S. Route 24 travels through the southern part of Noble Township from its southern border to its eastern border.  Other significant roads in the township include:
State Route 15, which travels from northwest to south through the center of the township
State Route 18, which travels from east to west through the center of the township
State Route 66, which travels from north to south through the eastern half of the township
State Route 424, a short distance of which travels along the north bank of the Maumee River in the southern half of the township

Defiance Memorial Airport is located in the northwestern corner of Noble Township.

References

External links
County website

Townships in Defiance County, Ohio
Townships in Ohio